The U-Sea Saskatchewan is a bulk cargo carrier owned by Canpotex of Canada, primarily used for the transport of potash between Canada and destinations in Asia. The ship is named after the Province of Saskatchewan, where much of the potash it carries originates.  This ship is the first of nine vessels to be built for a joint venture operated by U-SEA and Canpotex.

References

2010 ships
Cargo ships
Merchant ships
Merchant ships of Panama